Aberarder is a hamlet to the south of Loch Ruthven, Scottish Highlands and is in the Scottish council area of Highland. It lies on the B851 road, to the east of Loch Ness. After the Rising of 1745, Aberarder was owned by the Farquharsons of Invercauld.

References

Populated places in Inverness committee area